Sexual Healing is a 1993 American short film written and directed by Howard Cushnir and starring Helen Hunt, Anthony Edwards and Jason Alexander.

Cast
Helen Hunt
Anthony Edwards
Jason Alexander
Mare Winningham
Maggie Jakobson
Sharon Schaffer
Lena Adrianna

Production
The film was shot in Los Angeles.

Reception
Ken Tucker of Entertainment Weekly graded the film a D.

References

External links
 

1993 films
American short films
1993 short films
Films shot in Los Angeles
1990s English-language films